57 may refer to: 
 57 (number)
 one of the years 57 BC, AD 57, 1857, 1957, 2057
 "57" (song), a song by Biffy Clyro
 "Fifty Seven", a song by Karma to Burn from the album Arch Stanton, 2014
 "57" (album), a studio album by Klaus Major Heuser Band in 2014 
 "57 Live" (album), a live double-album by Klaus Major Heuser Band in 2015 
 Heinz 57 (varieties), a former advertising slogan
 Maybach 57, a car
 American Base Hospital No. 57
 Swift Current 57's, baseball team in the Western Canadian Baseball League
 FN Five-Seven, a semi-automatic pistol